Mason Reed Tobin (born July 8, 1987) is an American former professional baseball pitcher. 
He played in Major League Baseball (MLB) for the Texas Rangers in 2011.

Career

Los Angeles Angels
He was drafted three times - first, in the 15th round of the 2005 amateur draft by the Atlanta Braves. Next, by the Braves in the 45th round of the 2006 amateur draft, and last by the Anaheim Angels in the 16th round of the 2007 amateur draft. He was signed by scout Casey Harvie for a $125,000 bonus.

Tobin began his professional career in 2007, pitching for the Orem Owlz and AZL Angels, going a combined 4-1 with a 2.08 ERA in 14 games (13 starts). In 2008, he pitched for the Cedar Rapids Kernels, going 2-3 with a 3.13 ERA in eight starts. He pitched in only three games in 2009 (undergoing Tommy John surgery in the spring of that year), all for the Rancho Cucamonga Quakes and all relief appearances. That year, he posted a 0.00 ERA in 2 2/3 innings.

Chicago Cubs
In the 2010 Rule 5 Draft, Tobin was taken by the Chicago Cubs.

Texas Rangers
Though he did not play in 2010, the Rangers traded for him for cash considerations in December of that year. He made the team out of spring training in 2011 and made his debut in the second game of the season, coming in relief of starter Colby Lewis with a large lead against the Boston Red Sox. In one inning, he gave up 2 runs on 2 walks and a hit, that hit being Jacoby Ellsbury's first home run since 2009. He made only four appearances altogether before going on the disabled list for the remainder of the season with an injury to his pitching elbow.
 He made his major league debut on April 2, 2011. On April 6, 2012 the Texas Rangers announced they released Tobin from Triple-A.

San Francisco Giants
On January 10, 2013, Tobin signed a minor league contract with the San Francisco Giants.

On November 15, 2013, Tobin re-signed a minor league contract with the San Francisco Giants.

Second Stint with Rangers
On January 9, 2015, he signed a minor league contract to return to the Rangers.

Early life

Tobin was born in Glendive, MT. He was drafted into the Atlanta Braves from Kentridge High School in Kent, Washington. and drafted into Los Angeles Angels of Anaheim in 2007 from Everett Community College.

References

External links

1987 births
Living people
Texas Rangers players
Major League Baseball pitchers
Arizona League Angels players
Orem Owlz players
Everett Trojans baseball players
Cedar Rapids Kernels players
Rancho Cucamonga Quakes players
Fresno Grizzlies players
Sportspeople from Kent, Washington
Baseball players from Montana
Baseball players from Washington (state)
People from Glendive, Montana